Robert Clifford Gunning (born 1931) is a professor of mathematics at Princeton University specializing in complex analysis, who introduced indigenous bundles.

Gunning was born in Longmont, Colorado, and attended to high school in his hometown. In 1947 he was admitted into the University of Colorado, graduating with a bachelor's degree in 1952. For his graduate studies he went to Princeton University, where he earned his Ph.D in 1955 under Salomon Bochner with thesis A classification of factors of automorphy. He then taught at the University of Chicago and in 1956 as Higgins-Lecturer at Princeton University. At Princeton, Gunning became in 1957 assistant professor, in 1962 associate professor, and in 1966 professor. He was a visiting professor in São Paulo in 1958, Cambridge in 1959/60, Munich in 1967, Oxford in 1968, Boulder in 1970, and Los Angeles in 1972.

Gunning is known as the author of important books on functions of several complex variables.

From 1958 to 1961 he was a Sloan Research Fellow. He served as Princeton University's dean of the faculty from 1989 to 1995. In 2003 he received Princeton University's prize for outstanding teaching. For a number of years he was an editor for Princeton University Press and for the Annals of Mathematical Studies. He was also the editor of the collected works of Salomon Bochner. In 1970 he was an invited speaker at the International Mathematical Congress in Nice (Some multivariable problems arising from Riemann surfaces).

Among his doctoral students are Sheldon Katz, Henry Laufer, Richard S. Hamilton, Yum-Tong Siu, and Michael Eastwood.

In 2012 he became a fellow of the American Mathematical Society.

Selected works
 Analytic functions of several complex variables. Prentice-Hall 1965.
 Lectures on Riemann Surfaces. Princeton University Press 1966.
 Lectures on Vector Bundles over Riemann Surfaces. Princeton University Press 1967.
 Riemann Surfaces and generalized Theta Functions. Springer, Ergebnisse der Mathematik und ihrer Grenzgebiete, 1976.
 On uniformization of complex manifolds: The role of connections, Princeton University Press 1978
 Introduction to holomorphic functions of several variables. 3 vols., Wadsworth and Brooks/Cole, 1990.
 An Introduction to Analysis, Princeton University Press, 2018.

References

External links

 Robert Gunning's homepage

1931 births
Living people
20th-century American mathematicians
21st-century American mathematicians
Fellows of the American Mathematical Society
University of Colorado alumni
Princeton University alumni
Princeton University faculty
Complex analysts
Sloan Research Fellows
People from Longmont, Colorado
Mathematicians from Colorado